The 2021 Indian Premier League Final was played on 15 October 2021 at the Dubai International Cricket Stadium in Dubai, UAE. It was a Day/Night Twenty20 match, which decided the winner of 2021 season of the Indian Premier League (IPL), an annual Twenty20 tournament in India. Originally scheduled to be held on 30 May 2021 at the Narendra Modi Stadium in Ahmedabad, the tournament, along with the final, was suspended in May 2021 due to the COVID-19 pandemic, and was relocated to the United Arab Emirates. Chennai Super Kings won the match by 27 runs beating Kolkata Knight Riders, to win their fourth IPL title.

Background
On 7 March 2021, the Board of Control for Cricket in India (BCCI) announced the full schedule for the IPL. Six venues were chosen, with the Narendra Modi Stadium in Ahmedabad hosting 12 matches including the playoffs and the final. After the relocation to UAE, Dubai, which was also the host of the 2020 final, was chosen to host the final on 15 October.

Road to the final

Group stage
Chennai Super Kings started their campaign with a 7 wicket loss against Delhi Capitals in Mumbai. They went on to win five consecutive matches, before their run was brought to an end by Mumbai Indians. CSK started the UAE leg of the tournament with four wins, but lost their final three group matches. They ended the group stage with 9 wins and 5 losses, finishing second in the table behind Delhi Capitals.

Kolkata Knight Riders started with a 10-run win over Sunrisers Hyderabad in Chennai, but won only one of their next six games in India. In the UAE, Kolkata started with a 9-wicket win over Royal Challengers Bangalore. They won four of their remaining six matches and ended the group stage with 7 wins and 7 losses. Kolkata qualified as the fourth placed team after Mumbai Indians failed to beat Hyderabad by the required margin on the last day of the group stage.

League stage matches between finalists

Chennai won both the games played between the sides in the group stage, first one by 18 runs in Mumbai on 21 April, and second one by 2 wickets in Abu Dhabi on 26 September.

Playoffs
In the playoffs, Chennai Super Kings, as the second placed team, played in the first qualifier against Delhi in Dubai, whereas Kolkata Knight Riders played in the eliminator against Royal Challengers Bangalore.

Chennai qualified directly for the final, and Kolkata advanced to the second qualifier to play against the Capitals.

Kolkata beat Delhi and qualified for their first final since 2014, and their third final overall.

Match

Summary 
Eoin Morgan of the Kolkata Knight Riders won the toss and elected to put the opposition, Chennai Super Kings to bat. The Super Kings scored a total of 192 runs in their 20 overs, with Faf du Plessis scoring the highest with 86 runs from 59 balls. Chasing 193 runs for victory, the Knight Riders fell short and scored 165 runs in 20 overs for the loss of 9 wickets. Shardul Thakur was the highest wicket taker taking 3 wickets for 38 runs. The Super Kings won their fourth Indian Premier League Championship by winning the game by 27 runs. Du Plessis was declared the player of the game.

Chennai Super Kings Innings 
Batting first, the Super Kings had Indian batsman Ruturaj Gaikwad and South African batsman Faf du Plessis open the innings. In the first powerplay consisting of the mandatory six overs, the pair put on a total of 50 runs and remained unbeaten, with Gaikwad at 26 and du Plessis at 22 runs. The pair put on an additional 11 runs in the next two overs to reach a total of 61 runs at the first strategic timeout during which Gaikwad surpassed KL Rahul as holder of the Orange Cap. Du Plessis continued his fine form and brought up his 50 from 35 balls, including two sixes and five fours.  Gaikwad was the first wicket to fall, when he was out caught by Shivam Mavi off the bowling of Sunil Narine scoring a total of 32 runs, bringing former Indian batter Robin Uthappa to the crease. Du Plessis and Uthappa put on a total of 63 runs for the second wicket before Uthappa was out leg before wicket to Narine for a score of 31, at a strike rate of over 200. The Super Kings brought up their 150 runs at the end of the 17th over. English cricketer Moeen Ali joined du Plesis to contribute a quickfire 37 from 20 balls. The team went on to score 192 for the loss of 3 wickets, with du Plessis being out caught by Venkatesh Iyer at long-on off the bowling of Mavi at the last ball of the innings. Ali remained unbeaten. Narine was the pick of the bowlers taking a total of 2 wickets conceding 26 runs, while Mavi took 1 wicket for 32 runs.

Kolkata Knight Riders Innings 
Chasing a total of 193 to win from 20 overs, the Knight Riders opened with Shubman Gill and Venkatesh Iyer. The duo got off to a healthy start scoring a total of 55 runs in the first mandatory power play of six overs. The pair scored an additional four runs at the end of 7 overs when the Super Kings brought in their first strategic time out, with Gill unbeaten at 23 and Iyer unbeaten at 34. Iyer went on to bring up his 50 from 31 balls with a total of 3 sixes and 5 fours. However, the flow was interrupted when Iyer was dismissed by Shardul Thakur with Ravindra Jadeja taking a simple catch at deep cover for a lofted shot by Iyer. This triggered a fall of wickets, with Thakur claiming Nitish Rana off the very next ball, caught by du Plesis. Knight Riders lost the next four wickets having added only 27 runs, ending at 120 runs for the loss of 6 wickets during the next strategic time out taken at the end of the 15th over. New Zealand all-rounder Lockie Ferguson and Indian bowler Shivam Mavi mounted a late resistance, but, was not sufficient to get the team to the winning score. Knight Riders ended the innings at 165 runs for the loss of 9 wickets enabling a Super Kings win by 27 runs. Thakur was the pick of the bowlers taking 3 wickets while conceding 38 runs, while Josh Hazlewood and Jadeja took 2 wickets each.

Faf du Plesis was declared the player of the match in what was also his 100th game in the Indian Premier League. This was the Chennai Super Kings' fourth Indian Premier League championship victory.

Scorecard

 On-field umpires: Richard Illingworth and Nitin Menon
 Third umpire: Sundaram Ravi
 Reserve umpire: Virender Sharma
 Match referee: Javagal Srinath
 Toss: Kolkata Knight Riders won the toss and elected to field.

Fall of wickets: 1–61 (Gaikwad, 8.1 overs), 2–124 (Uthappa, 13.3 overs), 3–192 (du Plessis, 19.6 overs)

Fall of wickets: 1–91 (Iyer, 10.4 overs), 2–93 (Rana, 10.6 overs), 3–97 (Narine, 11.3 overs), 4–108 (Gill, 13.2 overs), 5–119 (Karthik, 14.5 overs), 6–120 (Shakib, 14.6 overs), 7–123 (Tripathi, 15.4 overs), 8–125 (Morgan, 16.3 overs), 9–164 (Mavi, 19.5 overs)

References

External links
 Match Centre at IPLT20.com
 Series home at ESPNcricinfo

2021 in Emirati cricket
Premier League Final
Final
2020s in Dubai
2021
October 2021 sports events in Asia
Sport in Dubai
Indian Premier League